Ninad Shah (born 7 January 1997) is a Hong Kong cricketer. He made his first-class cricket debut against Ireland in the 2015–17 ICC Intercontinental Cup on 30 August 2016.

References

External links
 

1997 births
Living people
Hong Kong cricketers
Place of birth missing (living people)